Phyllonorycter brunnea is a moth of the family Gracillariidae. It is known from the island of Rhodes in Greece.

The length of the forewings is about 3.1 mm.

The larvae feed on Ulmus species, probably Ulmus glabra. They mine the leaves of their host plant. The mine is made on the underside of the leaf between two veins and running alongside the midrib. Pupation takes place in a cocoon.

External links
Fauna Europaea
Blattminierende Lepidopteren Aus Dem Nahen Und Mittleren Osten. I. Teil

brunnea
Moths of Europe
Moths described in 1975